Rabbi Yisroel Dovid ben Menachem Nachum Harfenes is a Haredi posek ("decisor of Jewish law") and scholar, residing in Williamsburg, Brooklyn, New York. He is the Rabbi of the Yisroel Vehazmanim Synagogue in Williamsburg, and is the author of multiple books on Halakha. Many of the books he has authored are responsa

Many of his books are available online (for free) at hebrewbooks.org.

He is a dayan on the Hisachdus Harabonim Beth din in Williamsburg.

Personal life
His mother was Sara Harfenes and his father was R’Menachem Nuchem Harfenes.

His siblings are, Moshe Shaul Harfenes ob”m, Chanie Singer, Yoily (Yoel) Harfenes and Chaya Miriam Schachter.

Selected works
Yisroel Vehazmanim  on zmanim
Yisroel VeOraisa 
Chinuch Yisroel 
Mekadesh Hashabos 
Mekadesh Yisroel (responsa) 
Nishmas Yisroel 
Nishmas Shabos (responsa) 
Vayevarech Dovid 
Dudaei Yisroel 
Yisroel Araivim 
Shirai Dovid 
Pri Eitz Hadar 

Living people
American Haredi rabbis
People from Williamsburg, Brooklyn
American male writers
Year of birth missing (living people)
21st-century American Jews